Count Nicolò Beregan (also Berengani and Bergani; 1627-1713) was an Italian nobleman, lawyer and amateur opera librettist. His Giustino was first set to music in 1683 by composer Giovanni Legrenzi for Il Giustino, and later reused by both Vivaldi (Giustino, 1724) and Handel (Giustino, 1737).

Librettos
Annibale in Capita, set by Pietro Andrea Ziani, 1661

References

Italian opera librettists
1627 births
1713 deaths
Italian male dramatists and playwrights